Ifra Hormizd (Modern ) or Faraya Ohrmazd (Modern ) was a Sassanid noblewoman, spouse of Hormizd II and mother of Shapur II. She was the regent during the minority of her son between 309 and 325. 

Following the death of Hormizd, and the crisis of succession that followed, the noblemen of the country decided to hand over power to the last child of Hormizd, who had not yet been born of Ifra. Thus, the crown was placed on Ifra's belly, and she ruled over the country with nobles from 309 until the adulthood of her son, Shapur, who was declared mature to rule himself at age sixteen in 325.

Etymylogy 
There isn't much information about Ifra Hormizd's name, and only Jewish sources mentioned her name. Theodor Nöldeke also finds the name "Ifra" unclear.

Life
Ifra Hormizd had a Jewish father and she converted to Christianity later. There have been many accounts throughout history of her friendly relations and cooperation with the Jews at the court in achieving their goals. She has been mentioned in five chapters of Talmud. Talmud represents Ifra as a queen with interest in Judaism.

According to a Nestorian chronicle, the father of Shapur II's mother was Jewish. According to the corresponding chronicle, Ifra Hormizd was converted to Christianity by Shemon Bar Sabbae and it was one of the main reasons for execution of Shemon and persecution of Christians during reign of Shapur II.

Regency
Following the death of Hormizd II, his son Adur Narseh succeeded him, but after a while he was deposed and killed by noblemen. Nobles then blinded Hormizd's second son and his third son who was named Hormizd, was imprisoned. He escaped the prison shortly afterwards and took refuge in Roman Empire. Therefore the throne of Sassanid empire was considered for the unborn son of Hormizd by his wife Ifra Hormizd, who later became Shapur II.

References

Sources 
 
 
 
 
 
 

Jews in the Sasanian Empire
Christians in the Sasanian Empire
Sasanian queens
4th-century deaths
4th-century Iranian people
4th-century women rulers